Hearts and Arrows (H&A) diamonds are precision-cut variations of the traditional 57 faceted round brilliant cut. They are cut to "ideal" proportions with good optical symmetry, polish and a specific faceting pattern. When all these factors are present, the result is a repeatable, near perfect pattern of eight symmetrical arrows in the face-up position of the stone (called 'crown') and eight symmetrical hearts when viewed in the table-down position (called 'pavilion').

Design factors
The original Hearts and Arrows were diamonds that surfaced in the mid 1980s in Japan that embodied three important design factors. The first of these factors was that they were cut to what is known in the diamond industry as "ideal proportions," i.e. very close to those summarized by Marcel Tolkowsky in his 1919 book, Diamond Design. Second, they were cut with very good physical and optical symmetry so that they would garner the grade of "Excellent" in the system used by Japanese laboratories. The third important factor was that they were cut to a very specific brilliantine scheme to produce the accepted hearts and arrows pattern. This faceting scheme involves prescribed lengths and ratios as well as smaller table sizes that are imperative in producing a distinctive, repeatable and gradable hearts and arrows pattern.

Less than 1% of the world's diamonds are cut to hearts and arrows optical symmetry precision. This is in large part due to the greater amount of rough diamond that necessitates additional polishing to create diamonds with this precise optical symmetry. Diamond polishers take up to three times longer to cut diamonds of this cut quality, with much greater waste of the original diamond rough material. Using specialized tooling and high quality cutting wheels and in some cases 100X magnification, factories must employ careful analysis through every stage of production. Diamonds cut in this way are more expensive than average cut diamonds.

Viewer

To see the hearts and arrows pattern in a diamond, a specially designed light-directing viewer called a Hearts and Arrows scope is used. This hearts and arrows viewer is a simple device that allows the viewer to analyze the physical symmetry, contrast and alignment of facets of a diamond by viewing the stone through both the top (crown) and bottom (pavilion) of a diamond, by directing white and colored light at set angles in order to catch and reflect light back from specific facets and angles of the diamond.

Certification and scientific and technical research

In the early 1990s, when Hearts and Arrows  began to appear in America, they were much more high-tech than the grading labs were. When GIA began to encounter H&A diamonds, several key characteristics were noted in the report. The diamonds were extremely round, tables were 55-57%, the girdles were medium or thin to medium and polish and symmetry were graded excellent. This kind of consistent cutting was unheard of at the time and cut grading did not exist yet in America.

HRD (Hoge Raad voor de Diamant) applies objective criteria and uses an automatic measuring device developed in-house to determine whether a diamond meets the stringent Hearts & Arrows standard.

IGI (International Gemological Institute) is also one of the laboratories that certify Hearts and Arrows.

The WTOCD (Wetenschappelijk technish Onderzoeks Centrum voor Diamant) is one of the most important scientific and technical research centers for diamonds.  A proprietary software was developed by WTOCD to analyze the images according to the H&A by HRD Antwerp guidelines. Based on measurements of the H&A patterns, an expert system makes an evaluation of the guidelines. The system delivers consistent, objectively measured, H&A grades.

Diamonds with a Hearts and Arrows cut command a price premium in the world's market, reflecting the generally greater time needed to produce them and the greater loss of weight from rough, as well as their generally better overall cut quality. It has also become a popular sales tool in diamond marketing. Although the Hearts and Arrows property is indicative of a top-tier cut, it does not always mean the diamond will be the most brilliant.

Labeling

Some in the diamond industry disagree on which diamonds should receive the "Hearts and Arrows" label.  Because there used to be no industry standard, one person or company may say a diamond is a Hearts and Arrows diamond while another may say it is not. In the industry, the term "super ideal" is a common term that is coined and used to describe diamonds displaying perfect optical symmetry.  Most diamonds with an overall cut graded by GIA as "Excellent" (with Excellent symmetry as well) or American Gem Society as "0" (or "Ideal") will have some sort of hearts and arrows pattern when seen through a viewer, although the pattern may not be perfect. Many within the diamond industry believe the Hearts and Arrows pattern should be graded, and only those with the top grade should be called Hearts and Arrows. Those people believe that the mere presence of a Hearts and Arrows pattern is not sufficient to be considered a Hearts and Arrows diamond; the pattern must be perfect to fit within certain guidelines.

There are generally five main components that help to define a "Hearts and Arrows" super-ideal cut diamond. These include a diamond's:

 Pavilion angle range: 40.2–41.6° (40.6–40.8° is optimum)
 Crown angle range: 32.4–36.4° (34–35° is optimum)
 Table size range: 53–59% (55–57% is optimum)
 Lower girdle halves length range: 75–80% (77% is optimum)
 Star facets length range: 40–55% (45–50% is optimum) 

Nowadays IGI and HRD grade Hearts & Arrows optimal cut, and IGI have a specific certificate. GIA does not grade Hearts & Arrows cuts, although GIA certificates will sometimes contain a note stating "Laser Inscription: H&A."  This note on the GIA certificate simply indicates that "H&A" was laser inscribed on the diamond before it was graded by GIA. Neither the "H&A" laser inscription nor the corresponding note on the GIA certificate is an indication that GIA observed hearts and arrows patterns on the diamond.

The diamond industry is still somewhat behind the latest technological advances in hearts and arrows precise optical symmetry and thus has not established firm criteria for evaluating stones on this level. For consumers looking to purchase stones of this cut quality, it is best to review hearts and arrows images under an H&A viewer.

References

Diamond cutting